Kunde may refer to:

 Kunde (surname)
 Kunde, Nepal, a village in the Khumbu region of Nepal
 Kunde & Co, a Danish advertising firm
 Kunde Hospital, a hospital in Kunde, Nepal